The Colgate Raiders represented Colgate University in ECAC women's ice hockey during the 2015–16 NCAA Division I women's ice hockey season.

Offseason

April 15:  Incoming Freshman Shae Labbe was invited to Team Canada's Strength and Conditioning Camp.

Recruiting

Roster

2015-16 Raiders

Schedule

|-
!colspan=12 style="background:#862633;color:white;"| Regular Season

|-
!colspan=12 style="background:#862633;color:white;"| ECAC Tournament

References

Colgate
Colgate Raiders women's ice hockey seasons